Vinderup is a railway town in Northwestern Jutland, Holstebro Municipality, Denmark at the railway between Struer and Skive. Vinderup has a population of 3,077 (1 January 2022) and was the main town of the abolished Vinderup Municipality.

Transportation 
Vinderup is located at the Langå-Struer railway line and is served by Vinderup station.

Notable people 
 The Rosenkrantz noble family has a line called the Rydhave line (Line VII) relating to Rydhave near Vinderup in Jutland
 Laust Jevsen Moltesen (1865–1950) a Danish educated church historian; in 1909 he was elected in Vinderup to the Danish Folketing and was Foreign Minister of Denmark from 1926 to 1929.

References

Cities and towns in the Central Denmark Region
Holstebro Municipality